The 1921 All-Ireland Senior Football Championship Final was the 34th All-Ireland Final and the deciding match of the 1921 All-Ireland Senior Football Championship, an inter-county Gaelic football tournament for the top teams in Ireland. 

Dublin led 0-4 to 0-1 at half-time and a late Bill Fitzsimmons goal gave them a comprehensive victory.

It was the first of three All-Ireland football titles won by Dublin in the 1920s, which made them joint "team of the decade" with Kerry who also won three.

References

All-Ireland Senior Football Championship Final
All-Ireland Senior Football Championship Final, 1921
All-Ireland Senior Football Championship Finals
Dublin county football team matches
Mayo county football team matches